Wastl Witt (20 July 1882, Hausham – 21 December 1955, Munich) was a German actor.

Selected filmography
 S.A.-Mann Brand (1933)
 There Were Two Bachelors (1936)
 The Vagabonds (1937)
 Der arme Millionär (1939)
 The Sinful Village (1940)
  (1942)
 The Little Residence (1942)
 Tonelli (1943)
 Melusine (1944)
 Royal Children (1950)
  The Man Who Wanted to Live Twice  (1950)
 Kissing Is No Sin (1950)
 The Blue and White Lion (1952)
 The Poacher (1953)
 Marriage Strike (1953)
 Dear Miss Doctor (1954)
 The Sinful Village (1954)
 Hanussen (1955)
 The Double Husband (1955)
 The Mistress of Solderhof (1955)
 Holiday in Tyrol (1956)

External links
 

1882 births
1955 deaths
German male film actors
People from Miesbach (district)
Burials at the Ostfriedhof (Munich)
20th-century German male actors